Matt Mazurek (born March 7, 1984) is an American baseball coach, currently serving as the head baseball coach at Canisius College. After attending Jamestown Community College, Mazurek attended college at Canisius College and played on the Canisius Golden Griffins baseball team where he was named Canisius College Male Athlete of the Year in 2006. After graduating from Canisius in 2006, Mazurek went on to a three-year career in independent baseball, playing for the Joliet JackHammers in 2007, and the Rockford RiverHawks in 2008 and 2009. Mazurek served as an assistant baseball coach at Canisius College from 2007 to 2017. Mazurek was named head baseball coach at Canisius College on September 6, 2017. Mazurek was named the MAAC Coach of the Year in 2019.

Head coaching record

References

External links

 
 Canisius profile

1984 births
Living people
American people of Polish descent
Canisius Golden Griffins baseball players
Canisius Golden Griffins baseball coaches
Joliet JackHammers players
Rockford RiverHawks players
Junior college baseball players in the United States
People from Silver Creek, New York
Baseball players from New York (state)
Baseball coaches from New York (state)